Derya Arbaş (born Derya Zerrin Berti; June 17, 1968 – October 22, 2003) was a Turkish American actress.

Biography
Derya Arbaş Berti was the daughter of Turkish beauty queen and actress Zerrin Arbaş and Native American actor Dehl Berti. She was the granddaughter of Avni Arbaş; a renowned Turkish artist of Circassian descent.

Her parents divorced when she was an infant and Arbaş grew up in Southern California with Dehl Berti, his second wife and two half brothers. She had dual U.S. and Turkish citizenship and split her time between both countries. In Los Angeles, Arbaş, who starred in seven movies, was a member of the Screen Actors Guild.

In 1992, she won one of the major three roles in "Scarlett Finals" in Atlanta on October 4, 1992. She died from a drug-related heart attack at age 35 on October 21, 2003. She is interred at Oakwood Memorial Park Cemetery in Chatsworth, Los Angeles.

Filmography
Kuyucaklı Yusuf (1985) (Turkish Movie)
Alev Gibi (1986) (Turkish Movie)
Bitmeyen Sevda (1986) (Turkish Movie)
Bir Günlük Aşk (1986) (Turkish Movie)
Dilan (1986) (Turkish Movie)
Beyaz Bisiklet (1986) (Turkish Movie)
Gece, Melek ve Bizim Çocuklar (1993) (Turkish Movie)
Silk Stalkings Love Never Dies (U.S.A. TV Series - 1993)The Night, the Angel and Our Gang (1994)Çılgın Badiler (1996) (Turkish Movie)Hang Your Dog in the Wind (1997) (U.S.A.)Cinler ve Periler (2001) (Turkish Movie)Günah'' (2001) (Turkish Movie)

References

External links

American television actresses
American people of Circassian descent
American people of Turkish descent
Burials at Oakwood Memorial Park Cemetery
Turkish people of American descent
Turkish people of Circassian descent
Turkish people of Abkhazian descent
Actresses from Santa Monica, California
1968 births
2003 deaths
American film actresses
20th-century American actresses
21st-century American women
Drug-related deaths in California